Chloe Ann O'Neil (September 7, 1943 - November 15, 2018) was an American politician from New York.

Life
She was born Chloe Ann Tehon on September 7, 1943 in Watseka, Iroquois County, Illinois, the daughter of Stephen W. Tehon PhD (1920–2009) and Betty Irene "Mae" (Albright) Tehon (1922–2010). In 1952, the family moved to Syracuse, New York where Stephen W. Tehon worked for General Electric. She graduated B.S. in 1967, and later M.S., both from SUNY Potsdam. Then she taught school. In 1966, she married college professor John G. A. O'Neil (1937–1992), and they had two children. They lived in Parishville. Her husband was a member of the New York State Assembly from 1981 to 1992.

She also entered politics as a Republican, and was an aide to her husband during his Assembly tenure. Her husband died on December 10, 1992, in a car accident, and Chloe Ann O'Neil was nominated by the Republicans to run in the special election to fill the vacancy. She was elected on February 16, 1993, and remained in the Assembly (112th D.) until 1998, sitting in the 190th, 191st and 192nd New York State Legislatures.

Chloe was killed in a two-car collision on November 15, 2018 in the town of Dickinson, NY.

References

1943 births
Living people
People from St. Lawrence County, New York
Women state legislators in New York (state)
Republican Party members of the New York State Assembly
State University of New York at Potsdam alumni
People from Watseka, Illinois
21st-century American women